Roger I. Robinson (November 11, 1924 – April 24, 2004) was an American football player and coach. A former Syracuse University quarterback, Robinson served as the head coach at the State University of New York College at Cortland from 1963 to 1979. During his career, he took a sabbatical to study head and neck injuries.

Robinson was selected by the Washington Redskins in the 1946 NFL Draft.

References

External links
 

1924 births
2004 deaths
American football quarterbacks
Cortland Red Dragons football coaches
Lebanon Valley Flying Dutchmen football coaches
Syracuse Orange football players
High school football coaches in New York (state)
People from Endicott, New York
Players of American football from New York (state)